Boca Chita Key is the island north of the upper Florida Keys in Biscayne National Park, Miami-Dade County, Florida.

The key is located in Biscayne Bay, just north of Sands Key. An ornamental  lighthouse is present on the key.  The harbor has a bulkhead with cleats where boats may be tied.  There is a campground with picnic tables and salt water toilets. Fresh water and electricity are not available on the island.

On the north-west part of the island is the Boca Chita Key Historic District containing historic structures such as the Boca Chita lighthouse.

This key is sometimes confused with the similar-sounding Boca Chica Key over a hundred miles southwest on the lower Florida Keys.

Gallery

See also

References

Islands of the Florida Keys
Uninhabited islands of Miami-Dade County, Florida
Biscayne National Park
Islands of Florida